The 2000 United States House of Representatives elections in West Virginia were held on November 7, 2000, to determine who will represent the state of West Virginia in the United States House of Representatives. West Virginia has three seats in the House, apportioned according to the 1990 United States Census. Representatives are elected for two-year terms.

Overview

District 1 
 

Incumbent Democrat Alan Mollohan defeated Libertarian Richard Kerr. This district covered the northern part of the state.

District 2 
 

Republican Shelley Moore Capito defeated Democrat Jim Humphreys after incumbent Bob Wise retired to run for governor. This district covers the central part of the state.

District 3 
 

Incumbent Democrat Nick Rahall defeated Libertarian Jeff Robinson. This district covers the southern part of the state.

References 

2000 West Virginia elections
West Virginia
2000